was a Japanese poet, in particular one of the Thirty-six Poetry Immortals. He was the second son of Fujiwara no Kanesuke, also one of the Thirty-six Poetry Immortals. Though his mother's name was not recorded, the Gosen Wakashū, an anthology of Japanese poems, mentions the name "Mother of Kiyotada" (清正母). His elder brother was Masatada.

External links
 E-text of his poems in Japanese.

Japanese male poets
Fujiwara clan
958 deaths
Year of birth unknown
10th-century Japanese poets